Güzelsu is a village in the Ahlat District of Bitlis Province in Turkey. Its population is 1,851 (2021).

References

Villages in Ahlat District